The Delmar-Lema Historic District, in Memphis, Tennessee, is a historic district which was listed on the National Register of Historic Places in 1998.

It includes houses at 1044-1066 Delmar Avenue and at 1044-1060 and 1041-1061 Lemar Place, in Memphis.

The houses are shotgun houses with either Queen Anne or Craftsman influences.

References

Shotgun architecture in Tennessee
National Register of Historic Places in Shelby County, Tennessee
Historic districts on the National Register of Historic Places in Tennessee
Queen Anne architecture in Tennessee
American Craftsman architecture in Tennessee
Buildings and structures completed in 1895